Golden Boy is a song by German Eurodance artist Sin With Sebastian. It was released in October 1995 as the second single from his debut album of the same name. The song was released on CD format and discusses a certain view on life and lifestyle: fun loving, being lazy,  partying and the distinctive feeling of being "special" and "the best". "Golden Boy" peaked at number 4 in Finland and number 45 in Belgium.

Music video 
The music video for "Golden Boy" was directed by Austrian director Matthias Schweger. The video is distinctive for content such as faces amongst heaps of fruit and half-naked male dancers moving around the female singer who is holding a baby "golden boy". In 2008, when Sin With Sebastian looked through their archives they found some footage that was filmed during the time of the making of the video clip. Matthias Schweger also directed the music video for "Shut Up (and Sleep with Me)".

Credits 

Mixing: Andreas Herbig 
Music, Lyrics & Programming: Sebastian Roth 
Producers:Chris Von Deylen, Inga Humpe

Chart performance

References 

1995 songs
1996 singles
Sin With Sebastian songs
Music videos directed by Matthias Schweger